An outfit of the day (commonly abbreviated OOTD) is where fashion bloggers show what clothes (or outfits) they wear on a particular day or occasion. These are often found on social media websites, such as Tumblr, Instagram, and Pinterest, as well as various videos on YouTube. Mostly used by a younger female demographic, one example of a typical current outfit of the day would be a top from Forever 21, low rise jeans from American Eagle, UGG Australia boots, as well as some accessories including a Coach purse, makeup, and various jewelry. Similar to these blogs are known as "outfit(s) of the week" (OOTW), where the blogger will display what they plan to wear during a whole week (or several days).

References

Blogging
Fashion
Internet culture
Social media